Notable Achimotans listed below are either alumni ("Akoras") or were affiliated to Achimota School as teachers. According to the Constitution of the Old Achimotan Association (OAA), alumni members who completed a full course of study and teachers who taught at the school for at least five years are considered to be full members of the OAA, and are known as Akoras. Notable Akoras are those Achimotans that have excelled or played a pioneering role in their field.

Notable alumni

Political leaders

 Edward Akufo-Addo, President, Second Republic of Ghana (1969–72)
 Kow Nkensen Arkaah, first Vice President, Fourth Republic of Ghana (1993–97)
 Alhaji Adamu Atta, former Governor of Kwara State, Nigeria
 Kofi Abrefa Busia, Prime Minister of Government in the 2nd Republic (1969-1972)
 Alhaji Sir Dauda Jawara, first Head of State of The Gambia (1970–94)
 John Evans Atta Mills, President of Ghana (2009–12), second Vice President, Fourth Republic of Ghana (1997-2001)
 Robert Mugabe, second President, Republic of Zimbabwe
 Kwame Nkrumah, first President of Ghana, founding member and 3rd Chairman of the Organisation of African Unity, now African Union 
 Jerry John Rawlings, Head of State, Ghana, 1979, 1981–93; and President of Ghana (1993-2001)

Architecture

 Theodore S. Clerk, urban planner and the first formally trained, professionally certified Ghanaian architect of the Gold Coast, developer of the port city of Tema, first chief executive officer of Tema Development Corporation, first President of the Ghana Institute of Architects, presidential advisor to Kwame Nkrumah and recipient of the Rutland Prize from the Royal Scottish Academy.

Armed forces

 Major-General Nathan Apea Aferi, second Ghanaian Chief of Defense Staff of the Ghana Armed Forces, and former Foreign Minister
 Major Seth Anthony, diplomat and first African commissioned officer in the British Army
 Major-General (Rtd) Stephen Otu, first Ghanaian Chief of the Defence Staff of the Ghana Armed Forces
 Flight-Lieutenant (Rtd) Jerry John Rawlings, former officer of the Ghana Air Force, military Head of State, and President of Ghana
 Major-General Edwin Sam, former Chief of the Defence Staff of the Ghana Armed Forces
 Lieutenant-General Joseph Henry Smith, Ambassador to the United States, and former Chief of Army Staff
 Major Kojo Boakye-Djan, Spokesman of the Armed Forces Revolutionary Council

Aviation

 Captain Kofi Martin Ampomah, former pilot Ghana Airways, and head of the Ghana Civil Aviation Authority

Business

 T. E. Anin, Managing Director, and Chairman of the board of directors of the Ghana Commercial Bank (1972–1980)
 Ken Ofori-Atta, founder and Chairman of Databank Group; Finance minister
 Kwame Pianim, economist, consultant, and politician
 George Nenyi Andah
 J. S. Addo, former governor of the Bank of Ghana and founder of Prudential Bank 
 Esther Afua Ocloo, industrialist
 Mansa Nettey CEO of Standard Chartered Bank Ghana

Diplomats

 K.B Asante, former teacher and former Ghanaian High Commissioner to the UK
 S.K.B Asante, lawyer and International Arbitrator who has served as International Court of Arbitration of the International Chamber of Commerce, International Centre for Settlement of Investment Disputes (ICSID)
 Pauline M. Clerk, civil servant, diplomat and presidential advisor
 James Victor Gbeho, former Minister of Foreign Affairs
 Daniel Ahmling Chapman Nyaho, former Ghanaian ambassador to the United States of America; first African headmaster of Achimota College
 Ebenezer Moses Debrah, former diplomat
 Isaac Osei, former Ghanaian High Commissioner to the UK, and Chief Executive of COCOBOD
 Alex Quaison-Sackey, diplomat and Ghanaian permanent representative to the United Nations 
 Joseph Henry Smith, former Ghanaian Ambassador to the United States, and former Chief of Defense Staff

Education 

 Francis Agbodeka, former professor of History
 Reginald Fraser Amonoo, Retired professor of modern languages
 E. H. Amonoo-Neizer, former Vice Chancellor, KNUST
 Ernest Aryeetey, former Vice-Chancellor, University of Ghana
 Patrick Awuah Jr., President and founder of Ashesi University
 E. Bamfo-Kwakye, former Vice-Chancellor, KNUST
 Kankam Twum Barima, former professor of Agriculture, KNUST
 Daniel Adzei Bekoe, former Vice-Chancellor, University of Ghana
 George Benneh - former vice-chancellor of the University of Ghana
 Ernest Amano Boateng, first vice chancellor of the University of Cape Coast
 Kenneth Dike, first African Vice-Chancellor, University of Ibadan
 Emmanuel Evans-Anfom, physician and former Vice-Chancellor of the KNUST 
 F. O. Kwami, former Vice Chancellor,  KNUST
 Alexander Kwapong, former Vice Chancellor of the University of Ghana, and former Vice Rector of the UN University in Tokyo, Japan
 Ebenezer Laing, botanist and geneticist
 Ivan Addae Mensah, former Vice-Chancellor, University of Ghana
 Lawrence Henry Yaw Ofosu-Appiah, former Classics Professor, University of Ghana
 Akilagpa Sawyerr, former vice-chancellor of the University of Ghana
 Mary Ashun, Principal of Ghana International School.

Government

 Richard Abusua-Yedom Quarshie, former Minister for Trade and Industry (1969-1972)
 Kwame Addo-Kufuor, MP and former Minister of Defense
 Kwadwo Afari-Gyan, former Electoral Commissioner
 Osei Owusu Afriyie, Minister of state in the first republic
 Joseph Godson Amamoo, former deputy Minister of state in the second republic
 Austin Amissah, former Attorney General (January, 1979- September, 1979)
 Patrick Dankwa Anin, former Minister for Foreign Affairs and Supreme Court Judge 
 Daniel Francis Annan, first Speaker of Parliament, Fourth Republic of Ghana
 Kwabena Kwakye Anti, former Minister for Local Government (1969-1971)
 Susanna Al-Hassan, Ghana's first female Minister of State 
 Kankam Twum Barima, former Minister of Agriculture (1969)
Bashiru Kwaw-Swanzy, former Attorney General of Ghana
 Joyce R. Aryee, former PNDC Secretary, chief executive officer of the Ghana Chamber of Mines and executive director of the Salt and Light Ministries
 Obed Asamoah, former Attorney General and Minister for Foreign Affairs in the Fourth Republic of Ghana
 Jones Ofori Atta, former deputy Minister for Finance (1969-1972)
 William Ofori Atta, co-leader of Ghana Independence Movement, former Minister for Education, Culture and Sports, 1970–71; and former Minister of Foreign Affairs
 Samuel Wilberforce Awuku-Darko, former Minister for Works (1969-1971)
 Ekwow Spio Garbrah, Minister of Trade and Industries, former Ambassador to the United States, and former Minister of Education, and former Secretary of the CTO  
 Ramatu Baba, first female District Commissioner in Ghana and member of parliament during the first republic
 Charles de Graft Dickson, Minister of state in the first republic
 Modjaben Dowuona, first Registrar of the University of Ghana; Minister for Education (1966–1969)
 Komla Agbeli Gbedemah, former Finance Minister
 Samuel Phillip Gyimah, British MP, former Parliamentary Private Secretary to David Cameron, Minister for Universities in the Theresa May government
 Walter Horace Kofi-Sackey, former deputy Minister for Works (1969-1972)
 Alan John Kyerematen, former Ambassador to the United States, Minister of Trade and Industries
 Lawrence Rosario Abavana, Minister of state in the first republic
 Erasmus Ransford Tawiah Madjitey, CBE, first Ghanaian Commissioner of the Ghana Police Force, diplomat, and politician
 J. H. Mensah, former Finance Minister of Ghana, MP (1969–72), Leader of Government Business (2001), Senior Minister (2001-07)
 Amon Nikoi, former Governor of the Bank of Ghana (1973 - 1977) and Minister of Finance (1979 - 1981)
 Gloria Amon Nikoi (née Addae), first female Minister of Foreign Affairs
 Kofi Asante Ofori-Atta, fourth Speaker of Parliament, First Republic of Ghana
 Yaw Osafo-Maafo, former parliamentarian and former Finance Minister, adjudged Africa's Best Finance Minister in 2001 by the Banker Magazine of the Financial Times
 K.G. Osei Bonsu, former Minister of State (Protocol) (1969-1972)
 Victor Owusu, former Attorney General and Foreign Minister (1969–72)
 Richard Kwame Peprah, former Minister of Finance
 Kwame Safo-Adu, former Minister for Agriculture (1969-1972)
 Emmanuel Gyekye Tanoh, Minister for Health (1984-1986), Minister of Chieftaincy Affairs (1986-1988), and Attorney General of Ghana (1988-1993)

Health services

 Oblempong Nii Kojo Ababio V , traditional ruler and first Ghanaian dental surgeon
 Victor Asare Bampoe, physician, HIV/AIDS control and public health expert, deputy Minister of Health (2014–2017)
 Alexander Adu Clerk, psychiatrist and specialist in sleep medicine 
 Matilda J. Clerk, second Ghanaian  female physician
 Adukwei Hesse, physician-academic, tuberculosis control expert, prison reform advocate and Presbyterian minister
 Charles Odamtten Easmon, first Ghanaian surgeon and first Dean of University of Ghana Medical School
 Susan Ofori-Atta, first Ghanaian female physician  
 Fred T. Sai, physician and family planning advocate
 Jaswant Wadwhani, former Commanding Officer, 37 Military Hospital  
 Felix Konotey-Ahulu - sickle-cell expert
 Silas Dodu, pioneer cardiologist 
 Docia Kisseih, pioneer nurse

Legal and judiciary

 Dixon Kwame Afreh, judge and academic; justice of the Supreme Court of Ghana (2002–2003)
 Benjamin Teiko Aryeetey, Justice of the Supreme Court of Ghana (2009–2011)
 Kwamena Bentsi-Enchill, judge and academic; justice of the Supreme Court of Ghana (1971–1972)
 Anna Bossman, former Acting Commissioner of the Commission on Human Rights and Administrative Justice (CHRAJ)
 Samuel Kofi Date-Bah, judge and academic; justice of the Supreme Court of Ghana (2003–2013)
 Josiah Ofori Boateng, Justice of the Supreme Court of Ghana (1999–2001); Electoral Commissioner of Ghana (1989–1992)
 Annie Ruth Jiagge, first woman in Ghana and the Commonwealth of Nations to become a judge
 Justice Akua Kuenyehia, first African to service as Chief Justice of the World Court at the Hague
 George Mcvane Richard Francois, formerly justice of the Supreme Court of Ghana
 George Lamptey, justice of the Supreme Court of Ghana (2000–2002)
 G. S. Lassey, justice of the Supreme Court of Ghana (1965–1966) and Appeals Court judge (1966–1980s)
 Thomas A. Mensah, judge and academic; first president  of the International Tribunal for the Law of the Sea.
 Charles Onyeama, retired justice of the Supreme Court of Nigeria
 Justice E. N. P. Sowah, former Chief Justice of Ghana
 Gertrude Torkornoo, active Justice of the Supreme Court of Ghana (2019–)
 Seth Twum, Justice of the Supreme Court of Ghana (2002–2007)

Mass media

 Kwaku Sakyi-Addo, journalist, two-time winner of Journalist of the Year Award and Ghana's former correspondent for the BBC and Reuters
 Larisa Akrofie,  founder and editor-in-chief of Levers in Heels
 William Frank Kobina Coleman, Director General of the Ghana Broadcasting Corporation (1960–1970)
 Berla Mundi, television anchor and presenter for TV3.
 John Dumelo, award winning Ghanaian actor.
Stephen Bekoe Mfodwo, Director General of the Ghana Broadcasting Corporation (1970–1972)

Music

 Saka Acquaye, artist, sculptor, highlife and folk musician, co-founder of Black Beats Band and Wulomei
 Victor Kofi Agawu, music professor, Princeton University
 King Bruce, highlife musician; founder and leader of Black Beats Band; senior Civil Service official
 Philip Gbeho, classical musician and composer of Ghana's national anthem
 Kofi Ghanaba, aka "Guy Warren" Akwei, musician and drummer
 Emmanuel Gyimah Labi, composer, ethnomusicologist, pianist and former conductor of the Ghana National Symphony Orchestra
 Richie Mensah, musician and record producer
 William Chapman Nyaho, classical pianist
 Reggie Rockstone, musician and hip-life artiste
 Bernice Ofei
 DenG, singer and songwriter from Liberia
 Blitz the Ambassador, hip hop artiste and producer.

Politics

 Ebenezer Adam, member of parliament during the first republic
 Isaac Joseph Adomako-Mensah, member of parliament during the first republic
 Reginald Reynolds Amponsah
 Timothy Ansah, member of parliament during the first republic
 Dan Botwe
 Samia Nkrumah, first female Chair of the C.P.P, and former Member of Parliament of Jomoro Constituency
 Benita Sena Okity-Duah
 Gilchrist Olympio, Togolese politician and presidential candidate
 Obed Asamoah, former National chairman of the NDC

Science and technology

 Nii Quaynor, engineer and founder of NCS (now Ghana.com)
 Charles Wereko-Brobby, engineer and politician, and former chief executive officer of Volta River Authority

Sports

 Herbert Mensah, former chief executive officer of Kumasi Asante Kotoko FC
 Ernest Obeng, former world-class sprinter and Head of Broadcasting for the International Association of Athletic Federations 
 Francis Dodoo, olympic athlete

Writers

 Ayi Kwei Armah, author of The Beautyful Ones Are Not Yet Born
 Kofi Awoonor, poet, teacher, and diplomat
 Cyprian Ekwensi, short-story writer, author of children's books, pharmacist and broadcaster
 Nii Ayikwei Parkes,  writer, author

Principals and heads

 James Emman Kwegyir Aggrey, first vice principal and co-founder
 Rev. Alec Garden Fraser, co-founder and first principal; former principal of Trinity College, Kandy, Sri Lanka; and Gordonstoun, Scotland
 Bishop Robert Stopford, former principal and former Bishop of London

Former teachers

 Ephraim Amu, musician and composer
 John Barham, English pianist, composer, arranger, producer, choirmaster and educator
 Kofi Abrefa Busia, former teacher and former Prime Minister of Ghana in the 2nd Republic (1969 to 1972)
 Michael Cardew, potter
 Ken Kafui, musician and composer
 Charles G. Palmer-Buckle, Metropolitan Archbishop of Roman Catholic Church, Accra
Agnes Yewande Savage, first woman in West Africa to qualify in orthodox medicine

Other

 Sally Mugabe (née Hayfron), wife of President Robert Mugabe  
 Adeline Akufo-Addo (née Ofori-Atta),wife of President Edward Akufo Addo
 Nana Konadu Agyeman Rawlings, wife of President Jerry Rawlings
 Theodosia Okoh, designer of Ghana's national flag
 Grace Bediako, former Government Statistician
 Azzu Mate Kole II, Konor of Manya Krobo, 1939 - 1990
 George Briggars Williams, actor
 Elizabeth Frances Sey, first female graduate of the University of Ghana.
 Dag Heward-Mills, Bishop and founder of Lighthouse Chapel International
 Emmanuel Apea, Ghanaian actor and film director
 Chris Attoh, Ghanaian actor
 J. H. Cobbina, former Inspector General of Police of the Ghana Police Service

References

External links 
 Old Achimotans Association

Education in Accra
Achimotans